Tabalah is a village and wadi in the Asir Province of Saudi Arabia. In the 2010 census, Tabalah had a population of 5,670, of which 4,990 were citizens of Saudi Arabia and 680 non-citizens.

History

During the pre-Islamic period (pre-7th century), Tabalah was home to the shrine of the idol of Dhu'l-Khalasa. In the early Islamic period (7th–13th centuries), it was a large and prosperous town on the pilgrimage route to Mecca from Yemen, in between the way-stations of Bisha and Ajrab. According to al-Baladhuri and al-Tabari, the inhabitants of Tabalah accepted Islam without resistance and the Islamic prophet Muhammad imposed a poll tax on the Christians and Jews of the town and nearby Jurash. Muhammad had led or dispatched expeditions against members of the Khath'am tribe in Tabalah in 629 and 630 CE. The medieval Arabic geographers note that the town contained several springs and wells which watered the town's date palm groves and agricultural fields. According to the 10th-century geographer al-Hamdani, most of its inhabitants hailed from the Quraysh tribe of Mecca. It is most known in the medieval sources as being the short-lived governorship of al-Hajjaj ibn Yusuf, who considered it an insignificant post because it was hidden by a hill.

References

Bibliography 

Populated places in 'Asir Province